Camilo García de Polavieja y del Castillo-Negrete, 1st Marquess of Polavieja (13 July 1838 – 15 January 1914) was a Spanish general born in Madrid on July 13, 1838, in a family of merchants. He was an able commander, but considered as brutal as Valeriano Weyler of Cuba.

Early life and career
He enlisted voluntarily in the Navarro Regiment in 1855, where he distinguished himself in Africa. He received the Cross of Isabelle Maria Lucia for gallantry. He then took part in the Ten Years' War in Cuba, where Spain sent 70,000 men, and the Third Carlist War. He was Colonel of the Princess Regiment and promoted to brigadier general in 1876 before being sent to Cuba. In Cuba, he was made Field Marshal and received the Cross of Military Merit. In 1882, he returned to Spain and was made a member of the Supreme Council of War and Navy, Captain general of Andalusia, and Supreme Chief of Infantry Inspection.

Puerto Rico and Cuba
In 1888, Polavieja became Governor general of Puerto Rico, a post from which he resigned in 1889. A year later, in 1890, he was sent to succeed José Chinchilla as Captain general of Cuba. Being one of the more competent administrators of the time, he resigned in 1892 as a protest against corruption of Romero de Robledo, a politician well known for his corrupt practices, and appointed Minister of Colonies by Prime Minister Antonio Cánovas del Castillo. He was later known as the Butcher of Cuba.

Governor General of the Philippines
The revolution in Cuba led by Antonio Maceo Grajales inspired Philippine insurgents to revolt as well. Being the last important colony under control of Spain, the Spanish government tried to contain the Philippine Revolution under the administration of Ramón Blanco y Erenas. The further spread of the insurgency in the Philippines led to the turnover of the post of Governor general to Blanco's second-in-command, Lieutenant General Polavieja. The Filipino historian Gregorio Zaide notes that Polavieja was installed with the help of powerful Spanish friars including the Archbishop of Manila during that time. Polavieja oversaw the court martial and death of José Rizal on December 30, 1896. Twenty four more people were executed with Rizal.

As of August 1896, there are 500 soldiers in Manila and 700 in the rest of the archipelago. Native mercenaries numbered around 6,000. By January 1897, a total of 25,462 officers and men had arrived from Spain. Governor Polavieja had an available force of over 12,000 men to suppress the rebels in Luzon alone. On February 13, 1897, he opened his first phase, the Cavite campaign. Polavieja advanced against the revolutionaries with 16,000 men armed with Spanish M93s, and one field battery. They were led by General José de Lachambre, and many of the soldiers he led were from Pampanga, fired during Blanco's administration He had scarcely reconquered half of Cavite when he resigned, owing to his bad health. He did, however, disperse every major rebel contingent in Cavite. Around 4,000 rebels died in jails of Manila.

Rizal execution
Polavieja faced condemnation by his countrymen after his return to Spain. While visiting Girona, in Catalonia, circulars were distributed among the crowd bearing Rizal's last verses, his portrait, and the charge that Polavieja was responsible for the loss of the Philippines to the United States. Ramon Blanco later presented his sash and sword to the Rizal family as an apology.

Death
He went back to Spain and went on to influence the government of Spain. He declared preparation for a neutral or third party but his manifesto was prohibited for publication. He died of hepatitis in 1914.

Media portrayal
 Portrayed by Tony Mabesa in the 1998 film, José Rizal.

References

External link

Spanish generals
Captains General of the Philippines
Governors of Cuba
Governors of Puerto Rico
People of New Spain
People of the Philippine Revolution
People of the Ten Years' War
Spanish West Indies
1838 births
1914 deaths
Spanish military personnel of the Third Carlist War (Governmental faction)